We Walk This Road is the third studio album of Robert Randolph and the Family Band released in 2010 upon Warner Bros. Records. The album rose to No. 4 on the Billboard Top Christian Albums chart and No. 21 on the Billboard Top Rock Albums chart.

Overview
We Walk This Road is a mixture of original material and covers, recorded as a collaborative effort between Robert Randolph, T-Bone Burnett, Tonio K., Peter Case, and other soul- and gospel-oriented songwriters. The album also includes covers of songs by Blind Willie Johnson, Bob Dylan, John Lennon, and Prince as interpreted by Randolph and Burnett. The "Segue" tracks are segments of public domain performances by the blues musician Blind Willie Johnson.

Track listing

iTunes bonus tracks
 "Take My Hand" - 3:51
 "Don't Let the Devil Ride" - 4:23
 "Memphis Beat" - 3:34

Personnel

Album line-up 
 Robert Randolph - pedal steel guitar (tracks 2, 4, 5, 6, 8, 10, 11, 12, 14, 16, 17), lead vocals (2, 5, 6, 14), vocals (4, 8, 11, 12, 16)
 Danyel Morgan - bass (tracks 2, 5, 6, 8, 10, 11, 14), lead vocals (10, 17), vocals (2, 4, 5, 6, 8, 11, 12, 14, 16, 17)
 Marcus Randolph - steel guitar (tracks 10, 14, 16)

Guest appearances 
 Jay Bellerose - drums (tracks 2, 4, 6, 10, 12, 16, 17)
 Doyle Bramhall II - guitar, vocals (track 11), acoustic guitar (track 17)
 T-Bone Burnett - guitar (tracks 2, 5, 11, 14)
 Keefus Ciancia - keyboards (tracks 2, 5, 6, 8, 10, 11, 14, 16)
 Dennis Crouch - bass (track 16)
 Mike Elizondo - bass (tracks 4, 12), guitar (track 4)
 Will Gray - featured vocals (track 4)
 Jason Hamlin - acoustic guitar (track 10)
 Ben Harper - slide guitar, vocals (track 8)
 Jim Keltner - drums (tracks 4, 5, 8, 11, 12, 14, 17)
 Ben Kesler - banjo, drum programming, sequencing (track 4), recording engineer (track 10)
 Ken Kugler - tuba (track 6)
 Nick Lane - euphonium (track 6)
 Darrell Leonard - trumpet, trombonium, horn arrangements (track 6)
 Lenesha Randolph - vocals (tracks 2, 4, 5, 6, 8, 12, 14, 16, 17)
 Leon Russell - piano (track 17)
 Tommy Sims - bass (track 17)
 Ken Tussing - flugelbone (track 6)
 Patrick Warren - keyboards (tracks 4, 12, 17)

Production
 T-Bone Burnett – Producer
 Lenny Waronker - Producer (tracks 4, 12, 17)
 Mike Piersante - Engineer
 Tom Whalley - Executive Producer

References

External links 
 

2010 albums
Robert Randolph and the Family Band albums
Warner Records albums
Albums produced by Lenny Waronker
Albums produced by T Bone Burnett